Yekbas is a quarter of the town Boğazkale, Boğazkale District, Çorum Province, Turkey. Its population is 834 (2022). Before the 2013 reorganisation, it was a town (belde).

References

Boğazkale District